Ryan Davis (born Sebastian Waack, January 30, 1983 in Magdeburg) is a German record producer, live act, DJ and graphic designer living in Berlin.

Life 
Raised in the 90s-era of East Germany Davis got in contact with the hip-hop and techno scene which both where omnipresent in Germany at the time. The DJ was a central figure in this movement and inspired Davis to become a DJ himself and to create his first own electronic productions. Due to his classical guitar education he already gained foreknowledge for melodic compositions which he then could incorporate in his productions.

Career 
To this day the emphasis on melody is a trademark of Davis productions. In 2012 he published his first LP 'Particles of Bliss' on the record label Traumschallplatten. The increasing support of well-known DJs and producers of the electronic scene such as Aphex Twin at the Day & Night Festival 2017, Kiasmos, Dominik Eulberg or Apparat but also from bands like Depeche Mode - who played his music as opening act at the ‘Sound of the Universe‘ tour - emphasizes Davis standing and range in the musical landscape. For approximately 8 years he is touring worldwide and played his songs amongst others in Japan, Africa, Canada, Australia, India, Europe and Russia. Davis sees himself as a nomad who is drawn to labels that are open for his musical visions. Therefore, he is currently working with the British label Anjunadeep. Further releases on avant-garde labels such as Erased Tapes or Injazero show the constant development and diversifification of Davis' spectrum.

Besides his work as an artist Davis runs the record labels Klangwelt Records and Back Home which he formed in 2008 and 2009.

Discography (selection)

LPs 
 2012: Particles of Bliss (Traumschallplatten)

Singles & EPs 
2018: Home EP (Anjunadeep)
2018: Obsidian (Anjunadeep)
2018: Alow (Anjunadeep)
2018: Ryan Davis & Matthias Meyer - Love Letters From Sicily (Watergate)
2017: Jima (Parquet)
 2017: Aeons (Mango Alley)
 2017: Ryan Davis & Microtrauma - Traces (Soulful Techno)
 2016: Ryan Davis & Microtrauma - Recurrence (Bedrock)
 2016: From Within EP (Anjunadeep)
 2015: Ryan Davis & Microtrauma - Synthesis EP (Traumschallplatten)
 2015: Ryan Davis feat. LMNSKT - Kope/Hadron EP (Klangwelt)
 2013: State Of Mind EP (Traumschallplatten)
 2013: Ryan Davis & Applescal - Creatures EP (Atomnation & Back Home)
 2013: Ryan Davis & Electric Resque - A Walk EP (Traumschallplatten)
 2013: Ryan Davis & Bastard Beat - Coincide EP (Back Home)
 2013: Ryan Davis & Pan/Tone - Two Armed Bandits EP (Areal)
 2012: Ryan Davis & Undo - Destino EP (Factor City)
 2012: Satellite (Bedrock)
 2012: Windmills EP (Areal)
 2011: Light & Shadow EP (Traumschallplatten)
 2011: My White Zebra EP (Wunderbar)
 2011: Routes of Life EP (Traumschallplatten)
 2010: Asteroids EP (Nature Sonoris)
 2010: The Wolve EP (IRM)
 2010: Fawna EP (Proton)
 2010: Cocoon EP
 2010: In The Mirrors (Klangwelt)
 2010: The Modern Parables EP (Manual)
 2009: Perlentaucher EP (IRM)
 2009: Orchidee (Manual)
 2009: Changing Skies EP (Absolutive)
 2009: Pocket Universe EP (Factor City)
 2009: Zodiac (Archipel)
 2009: Solid City
 2009: Posters & Cakes EP (Back Home)
 2008: Zyrial Soundfood EP (Manual)
 2008: Clouds Passing By EP (Proton)
 2008: Wide Open Space (Klanggymnastik)
 2007: Neotron EP (Piemont)
 2007: Higher (Klanggymnastik)
 2007: Seabreeze (Klanggymnastik)
 2006: Transformer EP (Klanggymnastik)

Remixes  
 2018: Re:deep - Fragile (Ryan Davis Reconstruct) / Vordergrundmusik
2018: Lycoriscoris - Stella (Ryan Davis Rethink) / Anjunadeep
2017: Steve Gibbs - Adrift (Ryan Davis Remix) / Injazero
 2017: Kyson - You (Ryan Davis Revision) / Anjunadeep
 2017: Ryan Davis & Microtrauma - Calendula (Ryan Davis Redesign) / Traumschallplatten
 2017: Aparde - Elias (Ryan Davis Re:Imagination) / Lenient Tales
 2017: Olafur Arnalds & Nils Frahm - 00:26 (Ryan Davis Rethink) / Erased Tapes
 2016: Two People - If We Have Time (Ryan Davis Timeless Edit) / Liberation Music
 2016: Revell - Absurdum (Ryan Davis Subconscious Mind Rework) / Clouds Above
 2016: Josia Loos & Hey Joe - Scherbenwelt ( Ryan Davis Remix) / Blu Fin
 2015: Problem Makers - Lacerta (Ryan Davis Remix) / No Style Is Style
 2015: Oovation - Devotion (Ryan Davis Re-Visit) / Univack
 2015: Olaf Stuut - Summate (Ryan Davis Rethink) / Morgen.am
 2015: Boss Axis - Even Temper (Ryan Davis Rework) / Parquet
 2014: Olafur Arnalds - Only The Winds (Ryan Davis´ A Letter From Far Away Variation) / Anjunadeep
 2014: Bob Barker - Rondel (Ryan Davis Pandora Reshape) /Catch
 2014: Luis Junior - Alibi (Ryan Davis Remix) / Mooseekaa
 2014: Darin Epsilon - Shine The Light (Ryan Davis Reconstruct) / Hope
 2013: Andrew Bayer - Gaffs Eulogy (Ryan Davis Interpretation) / Anjunadeep
 2013: Electric Rescue - The Rave Child (Ryan Davis Cinematic Rebuild) / Bedrock
 2012: Micromattic - Uncanny (Ryan Davis Remix) / Absolutive
 2011: Dominik Eulberg - Täuschungsblume (Ryan Davis Narciss Render) /Traumschallplatten
 2011: Sasha - Cut Me Down (Ryan Davis Twin Break Edit) / Last Night On Earth
 2011: Fyed Roton - Araana (Ryan Davis Rough Cut) / Electrogravity
 2011: Russian Linesman  - I am Narcassist (Ryan Davis Leaves Of Autumn Remix) / Elefant
 2011: Pan/Tone - Rescue Me (Ryan Davis Rough Cut) / Areal
 2011: Dibby Dougherty & David Young - Tiger Forest (Ryan Davis Rework) / Bedrock
 2011: Pig & Dan -  Tears Of A Clown (Ryan Davis Interpretation) / Techno Therapy
 2011: Microtrauma - Saturation (Ryan Davis Remix) / Traumschallplatten
 2011: Espen & Elusive - Albatross Confessions (Ryan Davis Rework) / Mango Alley
 2011: Pole Folder - Indigo (Ryan Davis Remix) / Reworck
 2011: Mango & Kazusa - Asphalt Lines (Ryan Davis Interpretation)
 2011: Espen & Elusive - Albatross Confessions (Ryan Davis Rework) / Mango Alley
 2010: Max Cooper - Enveloped (Ryan Davis Reconstruct Remix) / Traumschallplatten
 2010: Andre Sobota - Red Dust (Ryan Davis Sub Dub Remix) / Proton
 2010: Sinner Dc - Digital Dust (Ryan Davis Epic Mix) / Ai
 2009: Groj - Edlothia (Ryan Davis Mix) / Klangwelt
 2009: Damabiah - Sur Les Genoux D L´Automne (Ryan Davis Remix) / Natura Sonoris
 2009: Electric Rescue - Vetetroi (Ryan Davis From Far Away Re-Edit) / Back Home
 2009: Spada - Nuvolette (Alt Fenster & Ryan Davis Waves Of Fate Edit) / Back Home
 2008: Moonbeam - Nature (Ryan Davis Firefly Aerobics/ Glowfly Lapdance) /  Proton
 2008: Spada - Irreversible (Ryan Davis Entedeckungen Fernab Vom Weg Tool) / Back Home

References

External links 
 Official Facebook page of Ryan Davis
 Official soundcloudpage of Ryan Davis
 Official bandcamppage of the labels Back Home and Klangwelt

1983 births
German record producers
German DJs
German electronic musicians
Living people
Electronic dance music DJs